Cantharus tranquebaricus, common name the Tranquebar goblet, is a species of sea snail, a marine gastropod mollusk in the family Pisaniidae, the true whelks.

Description
The length of the shell varies between 30 mm and 40 mm.

The shell is ovate and ventricose. It is of a uniform whitish or reddish color, furnished with ten or twelve longitudinal folds upon each whorl, and crossed by numerous transverse striae. It is covered with a thin, brown epidermis. The spire is but little raised, subturreted, pointed at its upper extremity. It is formed of five or six tapering whorls, flattened, keeled, crowned at their upper part, and constricted at their suture. The aperture is ovate, emargination slightly oblique. The outer lip is rather thin, of an orange color, denticulated, and strongly striated within. The columella is subumbilicated, smooth, brown or reddish colored. The inner lip shows a callosity at the base, and partially covering the commencement of an umbilicus.

Distribution
This marine species occurs off the Bay of Bengal; off Mozambique; as an invasive species in the Mediterranean Sea.

References

 Streftaris, N.; Zenetos, A.; Papathanassiou, E. (2005). Globalisation in marine ecosystems: the story of non-indigenous marine species across European seas. Oceanogr. Mar. Biol. Annu. Rev. 43: 419–453

External links
 

Pisaniidae
Gastropods described in 1791
Taxa named by Johann Friedrich Gmelin